Ken Charlton may refer to:

 Ken Charlton (basketball) (born 1941), All-American basketball player at the University of Colorado
 Ken Charlton (Canadian football) (1920–2004), running back for the Saskatchewan Roughriders
 Ken Charlton (rugby league) (1923–2012), rugby league player for the Canterbury Bulldogs